This is the discography of English new wave band Bow Wow Wow.

Albums

Studio albums

Live albums

Compilation albums

Box sets

EPs

Singles

Notes

References

External Links
 

Discographies of British artists
Rock music group discographies
New wave discographies